Interocean Shipping Company, Interocean Steamship Company of San Francisco was a subsidiary of the Bethlehem Steel Company founded in the late 1930s and closed in 1986.

During World War II Interocean Shipping Company operated Merchant navy ships for the United States Shipping Board. During World War II Interocean Shipping Company was active with charter shipping with the Maritime Commission and War Shipping Administration.Interocean Shipping Company operated Liberty ships and Victory ships for the merchant navy. The ship was run by its Interocean Shipping Company crew and the US Navy supplied United States Navy Armed Guards to man the deck guns and radio.

Ships
Ships:
Partial list as most ships were charted and not owned by Interocean:
Oswego Reliance, a tanker
James E. Davidson, a cargo ship 
SS Cosmic, a 745-foot cargo ship (charted not owned)
1930s charted:
Hanley (US) 
Brimanger (Norway)
Taranger (Norway) 
Heranger (Norway)
Villanger (Norway)
Trondanger (Norway)
Berganger (Norway) 
Moldanger (Norway)
Hindanger (Norway)

Interocean operated World War 2 ships:
World War 2 Victory ships:'

World War 2 chartered ships:
SS Augustana Victory
Denison Victory
Bowdoin Victory
SS Notre Dame Victory
Wabash Victory
World War 2 operated Liberty ships:
SS Elwood Mead
Ben B. Lindsey
Edward P. Alexander
Alfred C. True 
Anna H. Branch
Keith Vawter 
James A. Drain
James L. Ackerson
Isaac I. Stevens 
SS Lewis L. Dyche
Mello Franco

See also
Calmar Steamship Company
Ore Steamship Company
Bethlehem Transportation Corporation
World War II United States Merchant Navy

References 

Defunct shipping companies of the United States
Transport companies established in 1930
Transport companies disestablished in 1986
American companies established in 1930
1930 establishments in New York (state)
1986 disestablishments in New York (state)